Alice Bach (born 6 April 1942) is an American feminist biblical scholar. She is Archbishop Hallinan Professor Emerita of Religious Studies at Case Western Reserve University.

Biography
Alice Bach was born 6 April 1942, in New York City.
She studied at Barnard College.

Bach initially worked in New York City as an editor at a number of different publishing companies. 

She is an author of more than 20 children's books. Her novel Mollie Make Believe was one of The New York Times best books of 1974, while Waiting for Johnny Miracle was listed as a Notable Book by the American Library Association. 

Bach taught creative writing for two years at New York University's School for Continuing Education. After graduation from Union Theological Seminary, she taught religious studies at Stanford University and Case Western Reserve University.

In the field of biblical studies, Bach is best known for her work on the characterization of biblical women and the use of the Bible in the media.  Bach has also served as an editor of the Union Seminary Quarterly Review, Biblicon, and Biblical Interpretation.

Since retiring from academia, Bach has become a blogger, an activist for Palestinian freedom, and a writer about Palestinian issues.

Selected works
 Moses' ark : stories from the Bible , 1989
 Miriam's well : stories about women in the Bible, 1991
 Women, seduction, and betrayal in biblical narrative, 1997
 Women in the Hebrew Bible : a reader, 1998

Children's books
 Mollie Make Believe, 1974
 The smartest bear and his brother Oliver, 1975
 The meat in the sandwich, 1975
 The most delicious camping trip ever, 1976
 Waiting for Johnny Miracle : a novel, 1980

See also
 Christian feminism

References

1942 births
20th-century American novelists
American biblical scholars
Academic journal editors
American women children's writers
American women novelists
American children's writers
Barnard College alumni
Case Western Reserve University faculty
Christian feminist biblical scholars
Female biblical scholars
Living people
New York University faculty
Novelists from New York (state)
Novelists from Ohio
Old Testament scholars
Writers from New York City
20th-century American women writers
American women academics
21st-century American women